Pterygioteuthis gemmata is a species of squid in the family Pyroteuthidae.

References

External links
Tree of Life web project: Pterygioteuthis gemmata
Luminescent Flashing in the Midwater Squids Pterygioteuthis microlampas and P. giardi

Squid
Molluscs described in 1908
Bioluminescent molluscs
Taxa named by Carl Chun